This is a list of butterflies of Senegal. About 297 species are known from Senegal, one of which is endemic.

Papilionidae

Papilioninae

Papilionini
Papilio nireus Linnaeus, 1758
Papilio dardanus Brown, 1776
Papilio demodocus Esper, [1798]
Papilio menestheus Drury, 1773

Leptocercini
Graphium antheus (Cramer, 1779)
Graphium angolanus baronis (Ungemach, 1932)
Graphium leonidas (Fabricius, 1793)
Graphium auriger (Butler, 1876)

Pieridae

Coliadinae
Eurema brigitta (Stoll, [1780])
Eurema desjardinsii marshalli (Butler, 1898)
Eurema regularis (Butler, 1876)
Eurema hecabe solifera (Butler, 1875)
Catopsilia florella (Fabricius, 1775)

Pierinae
Colotis amata calais (Cramer, 1775)
Colotis antevippe (Boisduval, 1836)
Colotis aurora evarne (Klug, 1829)
Colotis celimene sudanicus (Aurivillius, 1905)
Colotis chrysonome (Klug, 1829)
Colotis danae eupompe (Klug, 1829)
Colotis euippe (Linnaeus, 1758)
Colotis evagore antigone (Boisduval, 1836)
Colotis halimede (Klug, 1829)
Colotis ione (Godart, 1819)
Colotis liagore (Klug, 1829)
Colotis phisadia (Godart, 1819)
Colotis vesta amelia (Lucas, 1852)
Colotis eris (Klug, 1829)
Pinacopterix eriphia tritogenia (Klug, 1829)
Nepheronia argia (Fabricius, 1775)
Nepheronia buquetii (Boisduval, 1836)
Nepheronia thalassina (Boisduval, 1836)
Leptosia alcesta (Stoll, [1782])
Leptosia wigginsi pseudalcesta Bernardi, 1965

Pierini
Appias epaphia (Cramer, [1779])
Appias sylvia (Fabricius, 1775)
Pontia glauconome Klug, 1829
Mylothris aburi Larsen & Collins, 2003
Mylothris chloris (Fabricius, 1775)
Dixeia doxo (Godart, 1819)
Dixeia orbona (Geyer, [1837])
Belenois aurota (Fabricius, 1793)
Belenois calypso (Drury, 1773)
Belenois creona (Cramer, [1776])
Belenois gidica (Godart, 1819)

Lycaenidae

Miletinae

Liphyrini
Euliphyra hewitsoni Aurivillius, 1899

Miletini
Spalgis lemolea lemolea Druce, 1890
Spalgis lemolea pilos Druce, 1890
Lachnocnema emperamus (Snellen, 1872)
Lachnocnema vuattouxi Libert, 1996

Poritiinae

Liptenini
Pentila condamini Stempffer, 1963
Pentila pauli abri Collins & Larsen, 2001 (manuscript name)
Pentila preussi fayei Stempffer, 1963
Eresina maesseni Stempffer, 1956

Epitolini
Cephetola subcoerulea (Roche, 1954)

Aphnaeinae
Pseudaletis leonis (Staudinger, 1888)
Cigaritis mozambica (Bertoloni, 1850)
Cigaritis nilus (Hewitson, 1865)
Zeritis neriene Boisduval, 1836
Axiocerses harpax harpax (Fabricius, 1775)
Axiocerses harpax kadugli Talbot, 1935
Axiocerses amanga borealis Aurivillius, 1905
Aphnaeus brahami Lathy, 1903
Aphnaeus orcas (Drury, 1782)

Theclinae
Myrina silenus (Fabricius, 1775)
Myrina subornata Lathy, 1903
Dapidodigma hymen (Fabricius, 1775)
Hypolycaena condamini Stempffer, 1956
Hypolycaena philippus (Fabricius, 1793)
Iolaus eurisus helius (Fabricius, 1781)
Iolaus alienus bicaudatus Aurivillius, 1905
Iolaus iasis Hewitson, 1865
Iolaus scintillans Aurivillius, 1905
Iolaus sudanicus Aurivillius, 1905
Iolaus menas Druce, 1890
Iolaus iulus Hewitson, 1869
Iolaus ismenias (Klug, 1834)
Iolaus calisto (Westwood, 1851)
Stugeta marmoreus (Butler, 1866)
Pilodeudorix catori (Bethune-Baker, 1903)
Pilodeudorix caerulea (Druce, 1890)
Pilodeudorix diyllus occidentalis Libert, 2004
Pilodeudorix zela (Hewitson, 1869)
Deudorix antalus (Hopffer, 1855)
Deudorix dinochares Grose-Smith, 1887
Deudorix dinomenes diomedes Jackson, 1966
Deudorix galathea (Swainson, 1821)
Deudorix livia (Klug, 1834)
Deudorix lorisona abriana Libert, 2004
Deudorix odana Druce, 1887

Polyommatinae

Lycaenesthini
Anthene amarah (Guérin-Méneville, 1849)
Anthene crawshayi (Butler, 1899)
Anthene larydas (Cramer, 1780)
Anthene liodes (Hewitson, 1874)
Anthene lunulata (Trimen, 1894)
Anthene princeps (Butler, 1876)
Anthene sylvanus (Drury, 1773)
Anthene phoenicis (Karsch, 1893)

Polyommatini
Cupidopsis cissus (Godart, [1824])
Cupidopsis jobates mauritanica Riley, 1932
Pseudonacaduba sichela (Wallengren, 1857)
Lampides boeticus (Linnaeus, 1767)
Cacyreus virilis Stempffer, 1936
Leptotes babaulti (Stempffer, 1935)
Leptotes jeanneli (Stempffer, 1935)
Leptotes pirithous (Linnaeus, 1767)
Leptotes pulchra (Murray, 1874)
Tuxentius cretosus nodieri (Oberthür, 1883)
Tarucus legrasi Stempffer, 1948
Tarucus rosacea (Austaut, 1885)
Tarucus theophrastus (Fabricius, 1793)
Tarucus ungemachi Stempffer, 1942
Zizeeria knysna (Trimen, 1862)
Zizina antanossa (Mabille, 1877)
Zizula hylax (Fabricius, 1775)
Azanus jesous (Guérin-Méneville, 1849)
Azanus mirza (Plötz, 1880)
Azanus moriqua (Wallengren, 1857)
Azanus natalensis (Trimen & Bowker, 1887)
Azanus ubaldus (Stoll, 1782)
Azanus isis (Drury, 1773)
Eicochrysops hippocrates (Fabricius, 1793)
Euchrysops barkeri (Trimen, 1893)
Euchrysops malathana (Boisduval, 1833)
Euchrysops nilotica (Aurivillius, 1904)
Euchrysops osiris (Hopffer, 1855)
Euchrysops reducta Hulstaert, 1924
Euchrysops sahelianus Libert, 2001
Oboronia guessfeldti (Dewitz, 1879)
Chilades eleusis (Demaison, 1888)
Chilades serrula (Mabille, 1890) (endemic)
Freyeria trochylus (Freyer, [1843])
Lepidochrysops polydialecta (Bethune-Baker, [1923])
Lepidochrysops synchrematiza (Bethune-Baker, [1923])

Nymphalidae

Danainae

Danaini
Danaus chrysippus alcippus (Cramer, 1777)
Tirumala petiverana (Doubleday, 1847)
Amauris damocles (Fabricius, 1793)

Satyrinae

Elymniini
Elymniopsis bammakoo (Westwood, [1851])

Melanitini
Melanitis leda (Linnaeus, 1758)
Melanitis libya Distant, 1882

Satyrini
Bicyclus angulosa (Butler, 1868)
Bicyclus funebris (Guérin-Méneville, 1844)
Bicyclus mandanes Hewitson, 1873
Bicyclus milyas (Hewitson, 1864)
Bicyclus pavonis (Butler, 1876)
Bicyclus safitza (Westwood, 1850)
Bicyclus sandace (Hewitson, 1877)
Bicyclus taenias (Hewitson, 1877)
Bicyclus vulgaris (Butler, 1868)
Bicyclus zinebi (Butler, 1869)
Ypthima asterope (Klug, 1832)
Ypthima condamini nigeriae Kielland, 1982
Ypthima doleta Kirby, 1880
Ypthima impura Elwes & Edwards, 1893
Ypthima vuattouxi Kielland, 1982
Ypthimomorpha itonia (Hewitson, 1865)

Charaxinae

Charaxini
Charaxes varanes vologeses (Mabille, 1876)
Charaxes fulvescens senegala van Someren, 1975
Charaxes candiope (Godart, 1824)
Charaxes protoclea Feisthamel, 1850
Charaxes boueti Feisthamel, 1850
Charaxes cynthia Butler, 1866
Charaxes lucretius Cramer, [1775]
Charaxes jasius Poulton, 1926
Charaxes epijasius Reiche, 1850
Charaxes castor (Cramer, 1775)
Charaxes brutus (Cramer, 1779)
Charaxes numenes (Hewitson, 1859)
Charaxes tiridates (Cramer, 1777)
Charaxes zingha (Stoll, 1780)
Charaxes etesipe (Godart, 1824)
Charaxes achaemenes atlantica van Someren, 1970
Charaxes eupale (Drury, 1782)
Charaxes anticlea (Drury, 1782)
Charaxes etheocles (Cramer, 1777)
Charaxes viola Butler, 1866

Euxanthini
Charaxes eurinome (Cramer, 1775)

Pallini
Palla decius (Cramer, 1777)

Nymphalinae

Nymphalini
Antanartia delius (Drury, 1782)
Vanessa cardui (Linnaeus, 1758)
Junonia chorimene (Guérin-Méneville, 1844)
Junonia hierta cebrene Trimen, 1870
Junonia oenone (Linnaeus, 1758)
Junonia orithya madagascariensis Guenée, 1865
Junonia sophia (Fabricius, 1793)
Junonia stygia (Aurivillius, 1894)
Junonia terea (Drury, 1773)
Salamis cacta (Fabricius, 1793)
Precis antilope (Feisthamel, 1850)
Precis octavia (Cramer, 1777)
Precis pelarga (Fabricius, 1775)
Hypolimnas anthedon (Doubleday, 1845)
Hypolimnas misippus (Linnaeus, 1764)
Catacroptera cloanthe ligata Rothschild & Jordan, 1903

Cyrestinae

Cyrestini
Cyrestis camillus (Fabricius, 1781)

Biblidinae

Biblidini
Byblia anvatara crameri Aurivillius, 1894
Byblia ilithyia (Drury, 1773)

Limenitinae

Limenitidini
Pseudacraea eurytus (Linnaeus, 1758)
Pseudacraea lucretia (Cramer, [1775])
Pseudacraea warburgi Aurivillius, 1892

Neptidini
Neptis agouale Pierre-Baltus, 1978
Neptis alta Overlaet, 1955
Neptis najo Karsch, 1893
Neptis kiriakoffi Overlaet, 1955
Neptis morosa Overlaet, 1955
Neptis nemetes Hewitson, 1868
Neptis nysiades Hewitson, 1868
Neptis serena Overlaet, 1955
Neptis trigonophora melicertula Strand, 1912

Adoliadini
Euryphura chalcis (Felder & Felder, 1860)
Hamanumida daedalus (Fabricius, 1775)
Aterica galene (Brown, 1776)
Euriphene ampedusa (Hewitson, 1866)
Euriphene gambiae Feisthamel, 1850
Bebearia senegalensis (Herrich-Schaeffer, 1858)
Bebearia sophus phreone (Feisthamel, 1850)
Bebearia phantasina ultima Hecq, 1990
Euphaedra medon pholus (van der Hoeven, 1840)
Euphaedra hastiri Hecq, 1981
Euphaedra laguerrei Hecq, 1979
Euphaedra villiersi Condamin, 1964

Heliconiinae

Acraeini
Acraea camaena (Drury, 1773)
Acraea neobule Doubleday, 1847
Acraea quirina (Fabricius, 1781)
Acraea zetes (Linnaeus, 1758)
Acraea egina (Cramer, 1775)
Acraea caecilia (Fabricius, 1781)
Acraea pseudegina Westwood, 1852
Acraea epaea (Cramer, 1779)
Acraea macaria (Fabricius, 1793)
Acraea vestalis Felder & Felder, 1865
Acraea bonasia (Fabricius, 1775)
Acraea encedana Pierre, 1976
Acraea encedon (Linnaeus, 1758)
Acraea serena (Fabricius, 1775)
Acraea perenna Doubleday, 1847

Vagrantini
Lachnoptera anticlia (Hübner, 1819)
Phalanta phalantha aethiopica (Rothschild & Jordan, 1903)

Hesperiidae

Coeliadinae
Coeliades aeschylus (Plötz, 1884)
Coeliades chalybe (Westwood, 1852)
Coeliades forestan (Stoll, [1782])
Coeliades hanno (Plötz, 1879)

Pyrginae

Celaenorrhinini
Celaenorrhinus galenus (Fabricius, 1793)
Eretis lugens (Rogenhofer, 1891)
Sarangesa laelius (Mabille, 1877)
Sarangesa phidyle (Walker, 1870)

Tagiadini
Tagiades flesus (Fabricius, 1781)
Eagris denuba (Plötz, 1879)
Caprona adelica Karsch, 1892
Abantis nigeriana Butler, 1901
Abantis pseudonigeriana Usher, 1984

Carcharodini
Spialia diomus (Hopffer, 1855)
Spialia dromus (Plötz, 1884)
Spialia spio (Linnaeus, 1764)
Gomalia elma (Trimen, 1862)

Hesperiinae

Aeromachini
Astictopterus abjecta (Snellen, 1872)
Prosopalpus debilis (Plötz, 1879)
Prosopalpus styla Evans, 1937
Gorgyra afikpo Druce, 1909
Pardaleodes edipus (Stoll, 1781)
Pardaleodes incerta murcia (Plötz, 1883)
Xanthodisca rega (Mabille, 1890)
Parosmodes morantii axis Evans, 1937
Acleros mackenii olaus (Plötz, 1884)
Acleros ploetzi Mabille, 1890
Semalea arela (Mabille, 1891)
Semalea pulvina (Plötz, 1879)
Hypoleucis ophiusa (Hewitson, 1866)
Meza indusiata (Mabille, 1891)
Meza leucophaea (Holland, 1894)
Meza meza (Hewitson, 1877)
Andronymus neander (Plötz, 1884)
Zophopetes cerymica (Hewitson, 1867)
Zophopetes quaternata (Mabille, 1876)
Artitropa comus (Stoll, 1782)
Gretna waga (Plötz, 1886)
Leona halma Evans, 1937
Caenides dacela (Hewitson, 1876)
Monza alberti (Holland, 1896)
Fresna cojo (Karsch, 1893)
Platylesches affinissima Strand, 1921
Platylesches batangae (Holland, 1894)
Platylesches chamaeleon (Mabille, 1891)
Platylesches galesa (Hewitson, 1877)
Platylesches moritili (Wallengren, 1857)
Platylesches picanini (Holland, 1894)
Platylesches rossii Belcastro, 1986

Baorini
Pelopidas mathias (Fabricius, 1798)
Pelopidas thrax (Hübner, 1821)
Borbo borbonica (Boisduval, 1833)
Borbo fatuellus (Hopffer, 1855)
Borbo gemella (Mabille, 1884)
Borbo holtzi (Plötz, 1883)
Borbo perobscura (Druce, 1912)
Parnara monasi (Trimen & Bowker, 1889)
Gegenes hottentota (Latreille, 1824)
Gegenes niso brevicornis (Plötz, 1884)
Gegenes nostrodamus (Fabricius, 1793)
Gegenes pumilio gambica (Mabille, 1878)

See also
List of moths of Senegal
Wildlife of Senegal

References

Seitz, A. Die Gross-Schmetterlinge der Erde 13: Die Afrikanischen Tagfalter. Plates
Seitz, A. Die Gross-Schmetterlinge der Erde 13: Die Afrikanischen Tagfalter. Text (in German)

Senegal

Senegal
Senegal
Butterflies